St. Augustine Catholic High School may refer to one of the following:
St. Augustine Catholic High School (Ontario)
St. Augustine Catholic High School (Tucson, Arizona)

See also
 St. Augustine High School
 St. Joseph Academy (St. Augustine, Florida) - The Catholic high school in St. Augustine, Florida